"Tall Cool One" is a song by English recording artist Robert Plant. The song was written by Plant and keyboardist Phil Johnstone, who also co-produced Now and Zen.
Former Led Zeppelin bandmate Jimmy Page plays guitar on the song.
It was the second single released from his fourth solo studio album Now and Zen (1988).

Background
The song features guitar riff samples of Led Zeppelin songs, including "Black Dog",
"Dazed and Confused", "Whole Lotta Love",

"The Ocean" and "Custard Pie",
as well as lyrical references to "Black Dog" and "When the Levee Breaks".

Cash Box called it a "smoking, balls-out rocker with a really unusual skew."

Chart performance
It reached No. 87 on the UK singles chart, No. 25 on the Billboard Hot 100 and number-one on the Billboard Mainstream Rock chart. It was Plant's fourth number-one rock single.

Popular culture
"Tall Cool One" was also featured in a commercial for Coca-Cola.

Charts

References

External links
 

1988 singles
Robert Plant songs
Songs written by Robert Plant
1987 songs
Songs written by Phil Johnstone